Burgajet is a settlement in the former Municipality of Lis, central Albania. At the 2015 local government reform it became part of the municipality Mat.

Notable people
King Zog of Albania was born in Burgajet.
Xhelal Bey Zogu

References

Populated places in Mat (municipality)
Villages in Dibër County